Sean Kingsley Cunningham (born December 20, 1986) is an American-Dutch professional basketball player. Cunningham usually plays the point guard or shooting guard position. He is a former member of the Dutch national basketball team.

Career
Cunningham started his professional career with Tindastóll in 2010, where he averaged 15.5 points and 4.9 assists in 17 Úrvalsdeild karla games. In 2011, he signed with ZZ Leiden of the Dutch Basketball League (DBL). In the 2012–13 season, he won his first DBL championship after beating Aris Leeuwarden 4–0 in the finals.

In 2014, Cunningham transferred to DBL side Donar, after winning one DBL championship and one Dutch Cup title with Leiden. In 2016, he won his first DBL title with Donar. In the 2017–18 season, Cunningham was named the DBL Defensive Player of the Year.

National team career
Although born in the United States, Cunningham has been a Dutch citizen since birth. In 2013, two of Netherlands' national team wins in the EuroBasket 2015 qualification where voided as FIBA counted him and Mohamed Kherrazi as naturalized players. Both players appeared in both the games and under FIBA rules only one naturalized player could be on the roster for any given game.

Personal life
Cunningham was born and raised in Los Angeles to a Dutch mother and American father, David Cunningham. His father died in November 2017, at the age of 82. After Donar's third national championship in a row in May 2018, Cunningham dedicated the victory to his father.

References

External links
Sean Cunningham on basketballeague.nl 
UC Riverside bio
Icelandic statistics at kki.is

1986 births
Living people
American expatriate basketball people in Iceland
American expatriate basketball people in the Netherlands
American men's basketball players
B.S. Leiden players
Basketball players from Los Angeles
Donar (basketball club) players
Dutch Basketball League players
Dutch men's basketball players
Point guards
Ungmennafélagið Tindastóll men's basketball players
UC Riverside Highlanders men's basketball players
Úrvalsdeild karla (basketball) players